Habib Ben Yahia (born 30 July 1938 in Tunis) is a Tunisian politician.

Career
From 1991 he served his first term as Minister of Foreign Affairs of Tunisia until January 1997 when he became defense minister. He served in that position until he became foreign minister for the second time in November 1999. He remained foreign minister until November 2004, when he left the government following a cabinet reshuffle. In January 2006 he was designated to be the secretary-general of the Arab Maghreb Union. He held this role until 2016.

Imprisonment
Habib Ben Yahia was sentenced five-year prison in March 2017 for power abuse.

References

1938 births
Living people
Foreign ministers of Tunisia
Arab Maghreb Union people